In Egyptian Culture, the zaffa ( / ALA-LC: zaffah), or wedding march, is a musical procession of bendir drums, bagpipes, horns, belly dancers and men carrying flaming swords. This is an ancient Egyptian tradition that predates Islam. When the procession reaches its destination, there is usually a party, more loud noises, and then dinner.

The Zaffa is also well-documented in many Egyptian movies ever since their start from more than a hundred years ago, which massively helped spread the ancient Egyptian tradition to the whole region.

Ancient Egyptian culture
Egyptian music
Egyptian culture
North African culture
Middle Eastern culture